Heptner's pygmy jerboa (Salpingotus heptneri) is a species of rodent in the family Dipodidae. It is native to temperate deserts in Kazakhstan, Uzbekistan, and possibly Russia. The species is named after Vladimir Geptner.

References

Salpingotus
Taxonomy articles created by Polbot
Mammals described in 1969